Ian Raymond Ogilvy (born 30 September 1943) is an English actor, playwright, and novelist.

Early life
Ogilvy was born in Woking, Surrey, England, to Francis Fairfield Ogilvy, brother of advertising executive David Ogilvy, and actress Aileen Raymond (who had previously been married to actor John Mills). His grandfather, Francis John Longley Ogilvy, was born in Argentina and a self-taught Gaelic-speaker who was a classics scholar and a failed financial broker. He was educated at Sunningdale School, Eton College, and the Royal Academy of Dramatic Art.

Career

Return of the Saint
He is best known as the star of the television series Return of the Saint (1978–79), in which he assumed the role of Simon Templar from Roger Moore (1962–69).

The role led to his being considered a leading contender for the role of James Bond in the early 1980s, when Moore announced his intention to leave the role. He never played the part (in part due to Moore's reconsidering his resignation on several occasions), although he did play a Bond-like character in a series of North American TV commercials broadcast in the early 1990s. At least once, in an episode of Kung Fu: The Legend Continues, "Dragon's Wing II", he played a Bond-like British agent, complete with white dinner jacket.

He recorded a series of readings of Ian Fleming's James Bond novels in the early 1980s, which were released on audio cassette by the Listen for Pleasure label.

Other notable roles
Ogilvy has had an extensive career in the theatre playing leading roles in many London West End productions, including Design for Living, Happy Family, Three Sisters, Rookery Nook by Ben Travers, Run for Your Wife, The Millionairess by Shaw, The Waltz of the Toreadors, and others. He has also worked widely in the American theatre. Among his films, Ogilvy had a major part in the 1970 epic film Waterloo.

He co-starred with Boris Karloff in The Sorcerers (1967); with James Mason, Bobby Darin, and Geraldine Chaplin in Stranger in the House (also 1967); with Vincent Price in Witchfinder General (also known as The Conqueror Worm, 1968); with Tom Courtenay and Candice Bergen in The Day the Fish Came Out (1967): with Meryl Streep and Goldie Hawn in Death Becomes Her (1992); with Peter Cushing in two films for horror specialists Amicus and with Richard Dreyfuss and Nia Vardalos in My Life in Ruins (2009) – among others.

He was a friend of the film-maker Michael Reeves and starred in all three of Reeves's films: Revenge of the Blood Beast (1966), The Sorcerers and Witchfinder General. He also had a role in the short-lived 1990s American soap opera, Malibu Shores. He has had roles in over one hundred television shows, often appearing as a guest star. He appeared in the television series Upstairs, Downstairs (as Lawrence Kirbridge).

He guest-starred in The Avengers in the 1968 episode "They Keep Killing Steed" as Baron Von Curt, and on the BBC in Somerset Maugham's The Door of Opportunity, opposite Marianne Faithfull.

In 1976, he featured in the pilot episode of the television comedy series Ripping Yarns, co-produced by former Monty Python members Michael Palin and Terry Jones. He also appeared in I, Claudius (1976, as Drusus), and guest-starred in 6 episodes of Murder, She Wrote and 4 episodes of Diagnosis Murder. He appeared as Edgar Linton in a film version of Wuthering Heights (1970) and as Owen Gereth in BBC dramatisation of The Spoils of Poynton (also 1970).

In the 1990s, he guest-starred in the American television series Babylon 5, in the episode "In the Kingdom of the Blind" (1998). The series' star, Bruce Boxleitner, is the former husband of Ogilvy's second wife, actress Kathryn Holcomb. In 2000 he guest starred in Dharma and Greg series, Season 3 Episode 15, "The trouble with troubadours", as the sarcastic British hotel night manager.

He was the subject of This Is Your Life in 1979 when he was surprised by Eamonn Andrews.

Writing career
Ogilvy is also a playwright and novelist, currently working on a series of children's books: Measle and the Wrathmonk, Measle and the Dragodon, Measle and the Mallockee, Measle and the Slitherghoul, and Measle and the Doompit. The books have been translated into at least 15 languages.

He has written and published two novels – Loose Chippings and The Polkerton Giant – and two plays: A Slight Hangover and Swap!, currently running in Poland in its third successful year. His memoir, Once a Saint, was published by Little Brown/Constable, in May 2016.

His book of film reviews 'Withering Slights', based on his Facebook page, was published by Spiteful Puppet in 2020

Personal life
Ogilvy was married to Diane Hart from 1968–83; they had one child. He married Kathryn Holcomb in 1992, and later became a naturalised United States citizen.

Filmography

Film

Television

References

External links

1943 births
Living people
20th-century English male actors
21st-century English male actors
21st-century English novelists
Alumni of RADA
English children's writers
English emigrants to the United States
English male film actors
English male dramatists and playwrights
English male stage actors
English male television actors
English people of Scottish descent
English screenwriters
English male screenwriters
People educated at Eton College
People educated at Sunningdale School
People from Woking
21st-century British screenwriters
21st-century English male writers